Rabbids Invasion is a French animated television series based on the Raving Rabbids video game series. Four seasons and a special have been produced by Ubisoft Film & Television, TeamTO, Supamonks, and Anima.

Series overview

Episodes

Season 1 (2013–2014)

Season 2 (2014–2016)

Season 3 (2016–2017) 
Note: This is the last season to air on Nickelodeon/Nicktoons. The next season was released by Netflix worldwide.

Season 4 (2018)

Season 5 (2021)
A special titled Rabbids Invasion: Mission to Mars, was announced in 2019. and was aired on 29 September 2021.

References 

Rabbids
Lists of French animated television series episodes
Lists of Nickelodeon television series episodes